Bay Point may refer to:

 Bay Point (Antarctica)
 Bay Point, California
 Bay Point (former settlement), California
 Bay Point, Florida (disambiguation)
 Bay Point (South Carolina), in Charleston, South Carolina's harbor; see Mitchelville
 Bay Point BART station, California
 Bay Point Schools, a detention site for undocumented immigrants, Miami, Florida

See also
 
 Bay Pointe, Cardiff Bay, Cardiff, Wales